Khorram Daraq (also known as Khorram Darreh, Khurem-Dara, and Khurram Darreh) is a village in Guzal Darreh Rural District, Soltaniyeh District, Abhar County, Zanjan Province, Iran. At the 2006 census, its population was 892, in 233 families.

References 

Populated places in Abhar County